The  Governor of Khanty–Mansi Autonomous Okrug — Yugra is the  head of the executive branch of the Khanty–Mansi Autonomous Okrug, a federal subject of Russia located in Western Siberia. The Governor is elected by the Duma of Khanty-Mansi Autonomous Okrug for a term of five years.

History of office 
On 18 November 1991, Alexander Filipenko was appointed Head of Administration of Khanty-Mansi Autonomous Okrug by the decree of the President of Russia Boris Yeltsin. Since 1989 Filipenko was the chairman of Khanty-Mansi regional executive committee (ispolkom), an executive body under the Soviet system. On 27 October 1996, he won the election, receiving more than 70% of the vote. Filipenko was reelected in 2000. Following the countrywide cancelation of the direct gubernatorial elections, which occurred in December 2004, Filipenko's fourth term was legitimised by the regional legislature.

On 8 February 2010, with the expiration of Filipenko's term of office, the President of Russia Dmitry Medvedev proposed the candidacy of MP Natalya Komarova to the Duma of Khanty-Mansi Autonomous Okrug. She was supported unanimously and was sworn in on 1 March 2010, becoming Russia's third female governor.

Despite the fact that elections of the governors by popular vote were legalised again in 2012, Khanty-Mansi Autonomous Okrug had chosen to keep the vote-in-parliament procedure, but now without the president's sorting of the candidates list. This gave the regional government a possibility to "annull" Komarova's first term. She successfully reelected in 2015 and 2020.

List of governors

Timeline

Notes

References 

Politics of Khanty-Mansi Autonomous Okrug
Khanty